The Tadyawan language is a language spoken by Mangyans in the southern Lake Naujan in Oriental Mindoro, Philippines.

Dialects
Tweddell (1970:195) lists four dialects.
Nauhan
East Aglubang
West Aglubang
Pola

Nauhan and East Aglubang are close to each other. The West Aglubang is spoken farthest out and has strong Alangan influence.

Barbian (1977) lists the following locations.
Barrio Talapaan, Socorro, Oriental Mindoro
Happy Valley, Socorro, Oriental Mindoro
Pahilaan, Calatagan, Pola, Oriental Mindoro

References

Northern Mindoro languages
Languages of Occidental Mindoro
Languages of Oriental Mindoro